The Church of Santa María la Blanca (Spanish: Iglesia de Santa María la Blanca) is a church located in the historic centre of Alcorcón, Madrid metropolitan area, Spain.

History 
The toponym Alcorcón is of Arabic origin.
It has been suggested that the church is on the site of a medieval mosque.  However, no remains have been found from the Islamic period. The existing fabric of the building does not contain any features which can be dated to earlier than the sixteenth century.

Conservation 
The church is protected by a heritage listing. It was declared Bien de Interés Cultural in 1994.

References

External links 

Maria la Blanca, Alcorcon
Bien de Interés Cultural landmarks in the Community of Madrid